Japan Lamborghini Owners Club, better known as JLOC, is an organization of Lamborghini car owners in Japan that was formed in 1980 to help information exchange between Lamborghini owners in Japan.

Members of JLOC would later form Team JLOC, a Japanese auto racing team that currently competes in the GT300 class of Super GT. Team JLOC first entered Super GT in 1994 and has been active in the series ever since, initially fielding cars in the GT500 class before switching to GT300 in 2006 due to the uncompetitiveness of its cars against factory-backed entries in GT500. Cars run by Team JLOC had also previously competed in the 24 Hours of Le Mans and the Asian Le Mans Series.

History 
JLOC was founded in 1980 by a group of Lamborghini Miura owners due to difficulties with getting spare parts and maintenance of their cars. Isao Noritake was elected as the chairman of the group. Seventeen members became part of the organization when JLOC held their first meeting in Sanza Villa, Hamana Lake in 1988 and by 2000, more than 100 members had joined the organization.

JGTC / Super GT 
In the early 1990’s, JLOC member Teruaki Terai wanted to take part in motorsport despite lacking a race car or a sponsor. In 1993, Terai managed to acquire a fire-damaged Lamborghini Countach that he planned to convert into a race car for the recently established All Japan Grand Touring Car Championship. Terai and Masahiko Mearashi, a former car magazine editor and a JLOC member, planned to reinforce the burnt chassis with a mono-plastic body with plans to enter the 1994 JGTC season, but by the spring of 1994 the project was still unfinished.

JLOC, competing under the KEN WOLF with Terai Engineering name in 1994, was initially unable to enter the season opening race at Fuji Speedway but they were requested to enter the race by the organizers after they heard the news of JLOC’s planned participation. Circuit no Ōkami’s mangaka Satoshi Ikezawa was invited by Mearashi to negotiate a deal with exotic car dealership Art Sports to supply a road-going Countach for JLOC. Due to the limited amount of time, the Countach was kept mostly stock but it received modifications to its bodywork, suspension, and engine. Noritake, who had flown to Italy to inform Lamborghini about the project, became Team JLOC’s team manager. F3000 driver Takao Wada and Ikezawa were signed to be their drivers, while the team also secured sponsorship from Rain-X. The car was mostly unsuccessful, having only finished two of the five races it competed in but it managed to score points with an eight place finish in the second round at Sendai.

For 1995, JLOC requested Lamborghini to develop a Lamborghini Diablo homologation special for JGTC competition. Three Diablo Jota’s were developed, two for competition purposes and one for road homologation; all three models still exist in Japan. The Diablo Jota would compete in all but one round of the 1995 season, scoring no championship points and a best finish of 13th at Sendai and Fuji respectively. Wada and Ikezawa were retained as the team’s drivers, although Ikezawa was replaced by Tatsuhiko Kanoumi for the final round at Mine. Tragedy struck the team that year, however, as Terai died from cancer in August. JLOC continued to campaign the Diablo Jota’s for the 1996 season, once again scoring no championship points at the end of the season.

In between the 1996 and 1997 seasons, Lamborghini contracted Signes Advanced Technologies (SAT) to develop the Lamborghini Diablo GT-1 Stradale, a racing version of the Diablo that was planned to be raced in the GT1 class at Le Mans. Financial difficulties would force the company to not go further with the project, but two cars had been built before the project was closed. One of the models, the racing version of the Diablo GT-1 Stradale, was bought by JLOC for the  1997 JGTC season. Hisashi Wada was also signed by the team to replace Ikezawa.

JLOC raced the Diablo GT-1 for the next four seasons. JLOC scored two points finishes with the Diablo GT-1 in 1998, but they failed to score a championship point in the 1997, 1999, and 2000 seasons. The 2000 version of JLOC’s Diablo GT-1 famously became the first Lamborghini car to be featured in Gran Turismo due to a licensing quirk. Sony Computer Entertainment, who at that time did not have the official Lamborghini licensing, paid JLOC to license their Diablo GT-1 for Gran Turismo 3: A-Spec. The licensing controversy meant that the JLOC Diablo only appeared in the NTSC-J version of Gran Turismo 3: A-Spec at Lamborghini’s request and only made its return in Gran Turismo 5, a year after Lamborghini’s introduction as a fully licensed manufacturer in 2009’s Gran Turismo for the PlayStation Portable.

JLOC redeveloped the Diablo GT-1 into the Diablo JGT-1 for the 2001 season, which featured a reworked chassis and suspension along with other parts specially built for JGTC. The Diablo JGT-1 was raced for three seasons but despite this, the car continued to score little success as it struggled to compete with the factory-backed entries in GT500. JLOC then switched to a brand new Lamborghini Murciélago R-GT for the 2004 season, labeled as the RG-1 by the team, but a lack of spare parts forced the team to race the Diablo JGT-1 for the fourth round at Tokachi. JLOC continued to be uncompetitive with the Murciélago R-GT in GT500 and when JGTC was rebranded into Super GT in the 2005 season, JLOC began to compete in the GT300 class after they homologated the R-GT for GT300 regulations.

JLOC made the full switch to GT300 class in the 2006 season and expanded to a two-car team with the addition of the #87 Murciélago RG-1, driven by Koji Yamanishi and Hisashi Wada. The team scored immediate success as the team’s #88 Murciélago RG-1, driven by long-time JLOC driver Marco Apicella and new signing Yasutaka Hinoi, won the season opening race at Suzuka to give Murciélago its first win in international competition. The #88 team would also score one pole position at Sportsland Sugo and finished 11th in the GT300 standings that year while the #87 team would finish 19th, having scored 3 points finishes and one fastest lap in Suzuka.

JLOC expanded further into a four-car team in 2007, entering two self-developed Lamborghini Gallardo RG-3’s alongside the two Murciélago RG-1 entries. The team downscaled into a three-car team in the following season as the team phased out one of the Murciélago entries before the Murciélago RG-1 was placed into retirement at the end of the 2009 season. The team competed with three Gallardo RG-3’s for the 2010 season and scored their best championship finish at the time with Yamanishi and future series champion Yuhi Sekiguchi in the #86 team, who finished 9th in the GT300 standings after scoring one podium, one pole position and five points finishes. 

JLOC continued to enter three RG-3’s in 2011 before expanding to a four-car team once more in 2012 after the team acquired two FIA-GT3 specification Lamborghini Gallardo’s. Manabu Orido and Atsushi Yogo, racing the GT3-specification Gallardo, recorded the team’s new best place finish in the standings as the duo finished 8th as the highest finishing team to not score a race win that year. By 2013, the team had fully phased out the RG-3’s and returned into a three-car team, all of them fielding GT3-specification Lamborghini Gallardo’s. JLOC downscaled further into a two-car team in 2014 and scored one win at Sugo, courtesy of Orido and Takayuki Aoki in the #88 Gallardo GT3. JLOC continued to field the Gallardo GT3’s for another season before they switched to the Lamborghini Huracán GT3 in the 2016 season.

The flagship number 88 JLOC car was a consistent points scorer on the team’s first season with the Huracán GT3, finishing 11th in the championship with the driver pairing of Orido and Kazuki Hiramine after scoring 6 top-10 finishes. JLOC’s performance was inconsistent in the following year, but Orido and Hiramine finished 10th in the standings and both JLOC cars finished on the podium at the Suzuka 1000km race. Orido left the team at the end of the 2017 season and was replaced by Lamborghini factory driver Marco Mapelli in the 2018 season. JLOC scored two pole positions that year with the #88 Huracán GT3, but was unable to score a victory as the Team JLOC cars finished 10th and 11th at the end of the season. 

Mapelli returned to Europe in the following year and was replaced by Takashi Kogure, who had been released from his Honda GT500 factory seat. Since Hiramine was signed by Kondo Racing in the off-season, Yuya Motojima was transferred from the #87 team to join Kogure in the #88 car. Kogure and Motojima would bring JLOC their best-ever championship finish to date as they finished the year in 7th with 36.5 points and 2 podium finishes. The #87 car, primarily driven by Tsubasa Takahashi and former GT300 champion André Couto with Kiyoto Fujinami entered on the endurance races, finished 8th after winning the Fuji GT 500 Mile Race.

Couto and Lamborghini factory driver Dennis Lind were due to compete with the team in 2020, but the advent of the COVID-19 pandemic meant that they were unable to foresee their deal with JLOC that year. JLOC would eventually retain Kogure, Motojima and Takahashi for 2020 as Shinnosuke Yamada, who raced with Team UpGarage as their endurance race driver last year, was signed by JLOC to partner Takahashi in the #87 car for the full season. The team struggled in 2020 as they only scored a total of three points finishes with Kogure and Motojima ending up as the best finishing JLOC car in 13th place on the standings. 

Kogure and Motojima continued to race the #88 JLOC car in 2021 as former IndyCar driver Kosuke Matsuura and Natsu Sakaguchi was signed to create an all-new driver line-up in the #87 car.  Kogure and Motojima enjoyed a better season that year as they were consistently finishing in the points, eventually finishing that year in 8th place with 1 podium finish and five points finishes. Matsuura and Sakaguchi, on the other hand, continued to struggled as they only recorded one points finish at Sugo, eventually finishing 20th in the driver standings. Despite this, all four drivers would be retained by the team for the 2022 season. The pairing of Kogure and Motojima went on to finish 13th in the drivers standings, having finished in the top-10 positions five times. Matsuura and Sakaguchi enjoyed a better season as they scored JLOC's lone podium finish of the year in the final round at Motegi and finished 15th in the driver standings. The team also played a crucial role in the championship as two late overtakes from both JLOC cars at Motegi, including a last-lap overtake on GAINER's Ryuichiro Tomita by Kogure, allowed Kondo Racing to clinch the GT300 title after the right front wheel of Kondo's Nissan GT-R GT3 came off the car midway through the race.

24 Hours of Le Mans 

JLOC first attempted to enter the 24 Hours of Le Mans in 2005, but they failed to secure an entry. They entered the 24 Hours of Le Mans for the first time in 2006 with a Lamborghini Murciélago RG-1LM, a Murciélago R-GT that was modified by JLOC for endurance racing. JLOC’s Super GT drivers Marco Apicella, Yasutaka Hinoi, and Koji Yamanishi would share the driving duties for the team’s debut at Le Mans. The team completed 283 laps but stopped with three hours left in the race and did not complete the final lap, leaving them non-classified in the final results. 

The team returned to Le Mans the next year with a driver line-up of Apicella, Yamanishi and Atsushi Yogo. JLOC received logistical support from DAMS for their participation in the 2007 race. Apicella suffered a major crash at the first Mulsanne chicane in the Wednesday first qualifying session, which damaged the RG-1LM beyond repair. JLOC successfully earned a dispensation by the ACO to replace their damaged RG-1LM with a standard R-GT for the race itself. In addition, Apicella was declared unfit after the crash, leaving Yamanishi and Yogo to compete as a duo. The team only completed one lap before it was forced to retire due to a broken driveshaft.

JLOC didn’t enter the 2008 edition of the 24 Hours of Le Mans and only returned for the 2009 edition with Apicella, Yogo, and Yutaka Yamagishi as the team’s drivers. JLOC suffered numerous mechanical issues throughout practice and qualifying that left them unable to qualify for the race. ACO, however, allowed the team to start the race. As Apicella and a number of mechanics had flown back home after the team’s initial failure to qualify, JLOC elected to start and park the car after completing just one lap.

For the 2010 race, JLOC was given an entry after the team won the Okayama 1000km race of 2009 that made up the sole Asian Le Mans Series round of that year. Yogo, Yamanishi, and Hiroyuki Iiri are elected to drive JLOC’s newly-prepared Murciélago LP670 R-SV for the race. The team retired at the 18th hour mark after only completing 138 races due to suffering from numerous puncture and transmission problems.

JLOC never received manufacturer support and struggled to be competitive during their four Le Mans attempts. In an interview with Motorsport.com in 2022, JLOC’s team principal Isao Noritake believes that the project struggled to be competitive because Audi lost interest in the Murciélago R-GT project, forcing JLOC to compete independently despite being the sole representative for Lamborghini at Le Mans.

Complete JGTC Results  
(key) (Races in bold indicate pole position) (Races in italics indicate fastest lap)

Footnotes 

Super GT teams
Japanese auto racing teams
Auto racing teams established in 1994
24 Hours of Le Mans teams